The snake lemma is a tool used in mathematics, particularly homological algebra, to  construct long exact sequences. The snake lemma is valid in every abelian category and is a crucial tool in homological algebra and its applications, for instance in algebraic topology. Homomorphisms constructed with its help are generally called connecting homomorphisms.

Statement 
In an abelian category (such as the category of abelian groups or the category of vector spaces over a given field), consider a commutative diagram:

where the rows are exact sequences and 0 is the zero object.

Then there is an exact sequence relating the kernels and cokernels of a, b, and c:

where d is a homomorphism, known as the connecting homomorphism.

 Explanation of the name 
To see where the snake lemma gets its name, expand the diagram above as follows:

and then the exact sequence that is the conclusion of the lemma can be drawn on this expanded diagram in the reversed "S" shape of a slithering snake.

 Construction of the maps 

The maps between the kernels and the maps between the cokernels are induced in a natural manner by the given (horizontal) maps because of the diagram's commutativity. The exactness of the two induced sequences follows in a straightforward way from the exactness of the rows of the original diagram. The important statement of the lemma is that a connecting homomorphism d exists which completes the exact sequence.

In the case of abelian groups or modules over some ring, the map d can be constructed as follows:

Pick an element x in ker c and view it as an element of C; since g is surjective, there exists y in B with g(y) = x. Because of the commutativity of the diagram, we have g'(b(y)) = c(g(y)) = c(x) = 0 (since x is in the kernel of c), and therefore b(y) is in the kernel of g' . Since the bottom row is exact, we find an element z in A'  with f '(z) = b(y). z is unique by injectivity of f '. We then define d(x) = z + im(a). Now one has to check that d is well-defined (i.e., d(x) only depends on x and not on the choice of y), that it is a homomorphism, and that the resulting long sequence is indeed exact. One may routinely verify the exactness by diagram chasing (see the proof of Lemma 9.1 in ).

Once that is done, the theorem is proven for abelian groups or modules over a ring.  For the general case, the argument may be rephrased in terms of properties of arrows and cancellation instead of elements.  Alternatively, one may invoke Mitchell's embedding theorem.

 Naturality 
In the applications, one often needs to show that long exact sequences are "natural" (in the sense of natural transformations). This follows from the naturality of the sequence produced by the snake lemma.

If

is a commutative diagram with exact rows, then the snake lemma can be applied twice, to the "front" and to the "back", yielding two long exact sequences; these are related by a commutative diagram of the form

 Example 

 

Given a short exact sequence of -vector spaces , we can induce an exact sequence  by right exactness of tensor product. But the sequence  is not exact in general. Hence, a natural question arises. Why is this sequence not exact?

According to the diagram above, we can induce an exact sequence  by applying the snake lemma. Thus, the snake lemma reflects the tensor product's failure to be exact.

 In the category of groups 
While many results of homological algebra, such as the five lemma or the nine lemma, hold for abelian categories as well as in the category of groups, the snake lemma does not. Indeed, arbitrary cokernels do not exist.
Then the connecting homomorphism can still be defined, and one can write down a sequence as in the statement of the snake lemma. This will always be a chain complex, but it may fail to be exact. Exactness can be asserted, however, when the vertical sequences in the diagram are exact, that is, when the images of a, b, and c are normal subgroups.

 Counterexample 
Consider the alternating group : this contains a subgroup isomorphic to the symmetric group , which in turn can be written as a semidirect product of cyclic groups: . This gives rise to the following diagram with exact rows:

Note that the middle column is not exact:  is not a normal subgroup in the semidirect product.

Since  is simple, the right vertical arrow has trivial cokernel. The sequence in the statement of the snake lemma is therefore
,
which indeed fails to be exact.

In popular culture
The proof of the snake lemma is taught by Jill Clayburgh's character at the very beginning of the 1980 film It's My Turn''.

See also
 Zig-zag lemma

References

External links

Snake Lemma at PlanetMath
Proof of the Snake Lemma in the film It's My Turn

Homological algebra
Lemmas in category theory